Egypt competed at the 2018 Mediterranean Games in Tarragona, Spain from 22 June to 1 July 2018.

Medals

Karate 

Ahmed Elasfar won the silver medal in the men's kumite +84 kg event. Malek Salama won one of the bronze medals in the men's kumite 60 kg event and Ahmed Elmasry won one of the bronze medals in the men's kumite 84 kg event.

Areeg Rashed won one of the bronze medals in the women's kumite 50 kg event. Giana Lotfy won the silver medal in the women's kumite 61 kg event.

Swimming

References 

Nations at the 2018 Mediterranean Games
2018
2018 in Egyptian sport